Anna Gutto, or Anna Guttormsgaard is a Norwegian director, writer and artistic director living in Los Angeles and Oslo.  Her career includes acting, writing, translating, directing and adaptations into English from Norwegian texts.

Early career 
Anna Gutto started her dedication to acting and story-telling through the theater already as a child. Not letting herself be sidelined by the largest roles being for men, she spent her childhood years playing several male characters. Committed to a professional life in the theater, she went from school and community theater to the performing arts high school Hartvig Nissen in Oslo. She made her professional debut in 1997 when director Stein Winge, artistic director Svein Sturla Hungnes and set designer John-Kristian Alsaker chose her to play Solveig in Peer Gynt at the Riksteatret (The Norwegian State Theater) after fierce competition. She later received a two-year contract at "Teatret Vårt" in Molde, where she played roles such as Lady Anne in Richard III, Bianca in The Taming of the Shrew, Nerissa in The Merchant of Venice, and Maja in Prinsen og pryleguten. There, together with Carl Morten Amundsen, she also created the one-woman performance Fidel's Island for the 2000 Molde International Jazz Festival. She has worked with award-winning Scandinavian theater artists such as Bjørn Sundquist, Hilda Hellwiig, Yngve Sundvor, Sven Nordin, Jan Grønli, and Sossen Krogh, among others. During her time in Molde she was also artistic director for the independent production of The Lover by Harold Pinter.

Worked with Jon Fosse 
Gutto's work has particularly pinpointed the development of translation and adaptation as an important part of cultural enhancement. Gutto was instrumental in bringing Norway’s most prominent contemporary playwright, Jon Fosse, to the United States. Fosse's plays have been staged all over the world, but it was not until 2004 with Anna's theater company Oslo Elsewhere's production of Night Sings Its Songs that the American audience experienced how this internationally renowned playwright has influenced modern theater. In 2006 Anna Gutto was also instrumental in bringing a contemporary adaptation of Henrik Ibsen's Rosmersholm to New York, allowing New Yorkers to take part in the 2006 international centennial celebrations of one of the world’s most-produced playwrights.

New York 
Her first theatrical creation in New York was Pissing in the Wind, which she co-wrote and directed for the 2002 New York International Fringe Festival. She did seven productions in the following years and in 2005 portrayed Simone in the production of The Workroom at Manhattan Theatre Source. The production was later invited by the French Embassy to be part of the Act French Festival in New York City 2005. She was last seen as Rebecca West in Rosmersholm at 59E59 Theaters in New York. Other acting credits include The Young Woman in the US-premiere of Jon Fosse's Night Sings Its Songs, Boys' Life, After the Fall, Under Milk Wood, Game of Patience, and The Physics Project.

Film and television 
She co-directed the Netflix Original series "Home for Christmas" in the spring of 2019. She directed her first short film "The Kangaroo" (winner, best mixed media short, Los Angeles International Family Film Festival) in 2010. Her following films are "Leila M." (short, 2012), "Miss Them When I'm on the Road" (short, 2012), Don't Tell Anyone (short, 2015) and "Mommy Heist" (short, 2016). She is slated to direct the feature film adaptation of the New York Times bestseller "Radical Remission" (Kelly Turner, 2014).

She has performed in a variety of films. In Gone With the Woman (Tatt av kvinnen), she acts alongside Peter Stormare. The film is directed by Petter Næss (nominated for the Academy Award for Best Foreign Film for Elling in 2002). Her other film credits include Millennium Crisis, Poise, Anniversary, Exercises in Separation, Family Reunion, Rebecca. Liliana and "InContact".

Essays and written works 
Gutto’s essays on theatrical work, across borders and the art of translation and adaptation from one country to another, have been published in industry publications such as Stikkordet, the magazine of the Norwegian Actors' Equity Association, as well as Kunnskapsforlaget's book Ibsens kvinner (Ibsen's Women), for which Norway's former Minister of Culture Ellen Horn was editor. Her essays focus on the art of translation and adaptation beyond the linguistic challenges. Her essay from Ibsen's Women describes her intentions, process, and development of the adaptation of Henrik Ibsen's Rosmersholm for a contemporary American audience. Miss Gutto has also worked as translator/adaptor on plays such as Water by Sheila Callaghan, The Lover by Harold Pinter and Rosmersholm by Henrik Ibsen. For the latter she worked in collaboration with American playwright Bridgette Wimberly and Norwegian dramaturge Oda Radoor.

Plays 
Gutto's plays include: Tid, Fidel's Island (co-created with Carl Morten Amundsen) and Pissing in the Wind. She is currently developing the new play IN SECURITY, where one can follow an accomplished doctor as she comes face-to-face with a choice that will affect the rest of her life. IN SECURITY is a comedic ripping view of a successful woman and her fear of commitment. It presents the insecurity at the core of human nature: the fear of losing oneself.

Oslo Elsewhere 
Gutto was co-artistic director of Oslo Elsewhere, a theater company she founded with Norwegian-American director Sarah Cameron Sunde in 2004, which is dedicated to the development of idiomatic translations and bridging the gap between contemporary Norwegian and American theater. After the run of the company's production of Night Sings Its Songs in 2004, Anna and Sarah were commissioned to create a performance for T.M. King Harald V and Queen Sonja of Norway for their New York visit in February 2005 entitled Variations on a Theme. This performance event was created to celebrate the 100th anniversary since the dissolution of the union between Norway and Sweden. The performance was a celebration of this peaceful separation, mixed with the stories of Norwegian immigrants to the US and performances of Norwegian artists living in New York.

Gutto's next project with Oslo Elsewhere was IBSEN+FOSSE2006, a double bill presentation of Henrik Ibsen's Rosmersholm alongside Jon Fosse's deathvariations at 59E59 Theaters in New York City the summer of 2006. Gutto and Sunde recently travelled to Nationaltheatret in Oslo together with director Timothy Douglas to conduct translation/adaptation workshop readings of both plays with actors at Nationaltheatret as well as Earle Hyman. Oslo Elsewhere last production of Jon Fosse was Sa Ka La, which premiered in New York in the fall of 2008.

The Unbound Collective 
The Unbound Collective (formerly known as The Unbound Theatre) is a New York-based theatre company where Miss Gutto was co-artistic director together with Stephanie Davis. Their work ranged from remounting Under Milk Wood by Dylan Thomas and The Workroom by Jean-Claude Grumberg to creating their own work. Their first production was Pissing in the Wind, which Anna Gutto created and performed in alongside another founding member, Josh Bloch. Pissing in the Wind was presented at the New York International Fringe Festival 2002.

Achievements and awards 
Gutto won the Zaki Gordon Memorial Award for Excellence in Screenwriting for her feature screenplay "Paradise Highway" (aka Leila M.). She was awarded the two-year Artist Working Grant from the Norwegian state (Arbeidsstipend for yngre kunstnere fra Statens kunstnerstipend). This two-year grant is the highest distinction awarded to artists under the age of 35. She also received a travel grant in 1999, while working at "Teatret Vårt" in Molde, and received the 2007 Cultural Award from American Scandinavian Society.  While working at "Teatret Vårt" she was also a part of Kunstnerisk Råd (Council for Artistic Decision) at the theatre. Anna Gutto completed a Master of Fine Arts at Columbia University where she graduated with Honors in 2016. She is a graduate of Circle in the Square Theater School. She has also studied in master classes with Susan Batson, Patrice Chereux, Terese Hayden, and Jacqueline Brookes. Gutto has been a member of the Norwegian Actors' Equity Association since 1998 and the Screen Actors Guild since 2006.

References

Sources
 "Tester Fosse og Ibsen på engelsk", from Norwegian newspaper Aftenposten
 "Kulturfest for kongeparet", from Norwegian newspaper Aftenposten
 NY Times : Young Suicide in the Eyes of Norwegian Playwrights Old and New, Ibsen and Non-Ibsen
 Biography with list of works

External links

1977 births
Norwegian stage actresses
Living people
Artistic directors
Screen Actors Guild
Norwegian theatre directors
Norwegian theatre managers and producers
Circle in the Square Theatre School alumni
Actresses from Oslo
Actresses from New York City
20th-century Norwegian actresses
21st-century Norwegian actresses
20th-century Norwegian women writers
21st-century Norwegian women writers
20th-century Norwegian translators
21st-century translators
21st-century American women
Columbia University School of the Arts alumni